Paul Gauthier (born 25 November, 1970) is a Canadian retired boccia player who competed in international elite competitions. He was the first Canadian Paralympic champion in boccia when he won the individual BC3 and won two bronze medals with Alison Kabush in the mixed pairs.

References

External links
 
 

1970 births
Living people
Sportspeople from Vancouver
Sportspeople from New Westminster
Paralympic boccia players of Canada
Boccia players at the 1996 Summer Paralympics
Boccia players at the 2000 Summer Paralympics
Boccia players at the 2004 Summer Paralympics
Boccia players at the 2008 Summer Paralympics
Boccia players at the 2012 Summer Paralympics
Medalists at the 2000 Summer Paralympics
Medalists at the 2004 Summer Paralympics
Medalists at the 2011 Parapan American Games
Medalists at the 2015 Parapan American Games